The 2009 Allstate 400 at the Brickyard, the 16th running of the event, was the twenty-first race of the 2009 NASCAR Sprint Cup season and the sixteenth NASCAR race at the Indianapolis Motor Speedway (IMS). It was the first race under the ESPN/ABC section of the TV coverage for the 2009 season. The 160-lap,  event took place on July 26 at the  IMS located in Speedway, Indiana (a separate town surrounded by Indianapolis). Along with ESPN, the IMS Radio Network, working with Performance Racing Network, provided radio coverage on terrestrial radio, World Harvest Radio International also provided Shortwave feed of the IMS coverage, and with Sirius XM Radio holding the satellite radio rights. Juan Pablo Montoya dominated the race leading almost 120 laps, but after a pit penalty while under green flag conditions toward the end of the race, Jimmie Johnson held off a hard charging Mark Martin to claim victory, his third triumph at the storied venue. The race will be known as Allstate 400, as Allstate Insurance announced that it would not renew its sponsorship of the race.

Tires
Following the fiasco surrounding tire wear in the 2008 race, infuriating the fans and everyone else involved, Goodyear held three tire tests afterward, with the most recent tire test held on June 15–16.  The drivers there agreed that the tire wear was much better than last year, mostly because the Car of Tomorrow was not run at IMS in 2007.

Race

References

Allstate 400 at the Brickyard
Allstate 400 at the Brickyard
NASCAR races at Indianapolis Motor Speedway
July 2009 sports events in the United States